Joel Bolomboy (born January 28, 1994) is a Ukrainian-born Russian-American professional basketball player for Olympiacos of the Greek Basket League and the EuroLeague.

He played college basketball for the Weber State Wildcats, where he was named Big Sky Conference Player of the Year in 2016. He was born in Ukraine but received Russian citizenship in 2018.

Early life and college career
Bolomboy was born in Donetsk, Ukraine to a Congolese father and a Russian mother of Tatar origin. The family moved to Fort Worth, Texas when Bolomboy was less than three years old. While in college, he told the Standard-Examiner that he did not "remember anything" about Ukraine and felt like he had "never been there."

He went to high school at Keller Central High School in Fort Worth, and chose Weber State for college despite interest from larger schools such as Clemson, Auburn and Florida State. During his college career, Bolomboy became the all-time leading rebounder in Weber State and Big Sky Conference history.

While always a strong rebounder, Bolomboy increased his scoring average in the 2015–16 season, averaging 17.9 points per game to go along with 12.8 rebounds per game. Following the season, Bolomboy was named first-team All-Big Sky Conference, as well as the league's Player of the Year and Defensive Player of the Year.

Professional career

Utah Jazz (2016–2017)
On June 23, 2016, Bolomboy was selected by the Utah Jazz with the 52nd pick in the 2016 NBA draft. On August 19, 2016, he signed with the Jazz. He made his NBA debut on October 30, 2016, recording three points, one rebound, one assist, one steal and one block in four minutes off the bench in an 88–75 loss to the Los Angeles Clippers. During his rookie season, Bolomboy had multiple assignments with the Salt Lake City Stars, Utah's D-League affiliate. In 26 games with the Stars, he averaged 16.5 points and 13.3 rebounds per contest.

On October 16, 2017, Bolomboy was waived by the Jazz.

Milwaukee Bucks (2017–2018)
On October 20, 2017, Bolomboy signed a two-way contract with the Milwaukee Bucks via their NBA G League affiliate the Wisconsin Herd. Throughout the length of his deal, he would split his playing time between the Bucks and their G League affiliate. However, Bolomboy would be waived from the team on January 7, 2018, after signing Xavier Munford to a two-way contract of his own accord.

Wisconsin Herd (2018) 
On January 10, 2018, Bolomboy re-signed with the Wisconsin Herd.

CSKA Moscow (2018–2022)
Bolomboy was signed by CSKA Moscow of the VTB United League on August 8, 2018, on a three-year deal. On March 2, 2020, he signed a two-year extension with the club. 

On 28 February 2022, Bolomboy left CSKA Moscow for personal reasons related to the Russian invasion of Ukraine.

Olympiacos (2022–present) 
On 6 July 2022, Bolomboy signed a one-year deal with Olympiacos of the Greek Basket League and the Euroleague.

International career
Bolomboy was invited to try out for the Ukraine national basketball team in advance of the 2014 FIBA Basketball World Cup. He was injured while practicing for the tournament and was unable to appear in any games. He was named to the Ukrainian team's preliminary roster in advance of EuroBasket 2017 but did not appear on the final roster.

In November 2018, Bolomboy became a Russian citizen. Bolomboy played for the Russia national basketball team during the 2019 FIBA Basketball World Cup qualifiers and the EuroBasket 2022 qualifiers. He missed the 2019 FIBA Basketball World Cup due to injury.

Career statistics

Regular season

|-
| align="left" | 
| align="left" | Utah
| 12 || 0 || 4.4 || .563 || .250 || '.500 || 1.4 || .2 || .1 || .2 || 1.8
|-
| align="left" | 
| align="left" | Milwaukee
| 6 || 0 || 6.3 || .500 || .000 || .500 || 1.7 || .0 || .3 || .0 || 1.5
|- class="sortbottom"
| style="text-align:center;" colspan="2"| Career
| 18 || 0 || 5.1 || .545 || .200 || .500 || 1.5 || .1 || .2 || .1 || 1.7

Playoffs

|-
| style="text-align:left;"| 2017
| style="text-align:left;"| Utah
| 2 || 0 || 4.5 || .667 || .000 || .000 || 1.0 || .0 || .0 || .5 || 2.0
|- class="sortbottom"
| align="center" colspan="2"| Career
| 2 || 0 || 4.5 || .667 || .000 || .000 || 1.0 || .0 || .0 || .5 || 2.0

EuroLeague

|-
| style="text-align:left;"| 2018–19
| style="text-align:left;" rowspan=4| CSKA Moscow
| 28 || 5 || 9.1 || .564 || .462 || .600 || 1.9 || .4 || .1 || .0 || 2.6 || 2.9
|-
| style="text-align:left;"| 2019–20
| 27 || 1 || 16.5 || .562 || .325 || .743 || 4.0|| .5 || .3 || .1 || 5.4 || 7.6
|-
| style="text-align:left;"| 2020–21
| 25 || 9 || 16.5 || .623 || .250 || .771 || 3.8 || .3 || .6|| .5 || 5.4 || 7.2
|-
| style="text-align:left;"| 2021–22
| 17 || 4 || 16.3 || .609 || .267 || .778 || 4.5 || .4 || .2 || .2 || 6.5 || 8.5

References

External links
Weber State Wildcats bio
Joel Bolomboy: My Life As An NBA Draft Prospect

1994 births
Living people
Basketball players from Texas
Centers (basketball)
Milwaukee Bucks players
National Basketball Association players from Ukraine
Naturalised citizens of Russia
PBC CSKA Moscow players
Power forwards (basketball)
Russian men's basketball players
Russian people of Democratic Republic of the Congo descent
Russian people of Tatar descent
Salt Lake City Stars players
Sportspeople from Donetsk
Sportspeople from Fort Worth, Texas
Ukrainian emigrants to Russia
Ukrainian expatriate basketball people in Russia 
Ukrainian expatriate basketball people in the United States
Ukrainian men's basketball players
Ukrainian people of Democratic Republic of the Congo descent
Ukrainian people of Russian descent
Utah Jazz draft picks
Utah Jazz players
Weber State Wildcats men's basketball players
Wisconsin Herd players